Lin Yi-shih (born 19 August 1968) is a Taiwanese politician. He was the Secretary-General of the Executive Yuan in 2012.

Education
Lin studied dentistry at Taipei Medical College and later graduated from National Sun Yat-sen University (NSYSU).

Political career
Lin served as a legislator from 1999 to 2012, and as vice chairperson of the Kuomintang from 2006 to 2008.

In January 2012, Lin was appointed as the Secretary-General of the Executive Yuan, making him the youngest person to ever hold the position. On 27 June 2012, local media reported that Lin had accepted a bribe of NT$63 million from Chen Chi-hsiang in exchange for helping his Dih Yeon Mineral Selection Company secure a contract from China Steel Corporation in 2010. The Taipei District Court sentenced Lin to seven years and four months in prison, stripped him of civil rights for five years, and ordered him to pay a fine of NT$15.8 million. Lin appealed the ruling to the Taiwan High Court, which lengthened his prison term to 13 years and six months. A subsequent appeal to the Supreme Court found Lin guilty of "holding properties of unknown origin," for which he was issued a sentence of two years imprisonment. A second charge, of "receiving bribes in breach of official duties," regarded as a violation of the Anti-Corruption Act, was returned to the High Court for retrial. The Taiwan High Court added six months to Lin's sentence in April 2019.

Personal life
Lin's father  died in 2013.

References

Kuomintang Members of the Legislative Yuan in Taiwan
Living people
1968 births
Taipei Medical University alumni
National Sun Yat-sen University alumni
Members of the 7th Legislative Yuan
Members of the 6th Legislative Yuan
Members of the 5th Legislative Yuan
Members of the 4th Legislative Yuan
Kaohsiung Members of the Legislative Yuan
Taiwanese politicians convicted of corruption
Taiwanese politicians convicted of bribery